Fort Loramie High School is a public high school in Fort Loramie, Ohio in Shelby County.  It is the only high school in the Fort Loramie School district. The high school is located at 600 East Park Street.  This building houses students in grades 7–12.  Students in grades K-6 attend the Fort Loramie Elementary School which is located at 35 Elm Street.  The district serves between 780 and 820 students in any given school year.  The motto for the district and the community is:  "A Great Place to Learn and a Great Place to Live!"  The mascot is the Redskin and the school colors are red and black.  They primarily compete in the Shelby County Athletic League, but play football as an independent.

The Board of Education for the Fort Loramie Schools consists of five people.  There are approximately 26 faculty members at the Junior High/High School.

The district provides students in grades 9–12 with nearly 90 course offerings. There is a variety of extracurricular clubs and activities including National Honor Society, History Club, FCCLA, Academia, Science Olympiad, and Spanish Club.  Students can also participate in the following sports:  basketball, baseball, football, volleyball, track, cross country, golf, softball, bowling, and cheerleading.

Athletics

Ohio High School Athletic Association State Championships 

 Boys Baseball - 2007, 2010, 2018 
 Boys Basketball – 1977, 1987, 1993 
 Girls Cross Country – 2002 
 Girls Basketball - 2013, 2015, 2021
 Girls Volleyball - 2014
 Boys Cross Country - 2016, 2018

Notable alumni
 Jared Hoying - Former outfielder for the Texas Rangers and in the Korean Baseball Organization.

See also
Native American mascot controversy
Sports teams named Redskins

External links
 District Website
 Ohio Department of Education website .

Notes and references

High schools in Shelby County, Ohio
Public high schools in Ohio
Public middle schools in Ohio